Sir Emmanuel Neville Cenac   (born 24 November 1939) is the former governor-general of Saint Lucia. He was appointed to that post in January 2018. On 28 July 2021 Cenac is reported to have signalled his intention to resign. As of 31 October, he demitted the viceregal office (but his demission was with effect 10 November). He was previously best known as a Saint Lucian politician, serving as the Minister of Foreign Affairs from 1987 to 1992.

On 18 January 2018, Cenac was appointed Knight Grand Cross of the Order of St Michael and St George (GCMG) in the 2018 Special Honours.

Also in 2018, Cenac was appointed Grand Cross of the Order of Saint Lucia (GCSL), in his capacity as Chancellor of the Order.

Family
Cenac was the brother of Prime Minister Winston Cenac, who was the head of government for eight months from 1981 to 1982.

Opposition parliamentarian
Cenac was the leader of the opposition Saint Lucia Labour Party in December 1982, during a constitutional dispute over the status of Governor-General Boswell Williams. John Compton, the serving prime minister and a member of the governing United Workers Party, had taken steps to have Williams unseated. In response, Cenac wrote a letter to Elizabeth II of the United Kingdom, the monarch of Saint Lucia, asking her to disregard Compton's actions. The dispute ended when Williams resigned on 13 December 1982.

Cenac was returned as a Labour Party member of the Saint Lucian parliament during the country's two successive elections in April 1987.

The website of the Saint Lucia Labour Party indicates that Cenac was elected for the Laborie constituency in two elections as well as representing the party at the municipal level in Castries.

Cabinet minister
Cenac changed his political affiliation on 2 June 1987, joining the United Workers Party group in parliament and becoming the country's foreign minister. When asked why he changed sides, Cenac simply responded, "broken promises". The change increased the Workers Party's legislative majority from one vote (9-8) to three votes (10-7).

Cenac spoke before the United Nations General Assembly in October 1987, saying that Saint Lucia was considering political union with other small Caribbean nations. He argued that quality of life issues could be improved if the region no longer had to support "seven governors-general, seven prime ministers, [and] 60 ministers for a total population for about 500,000." Cenac also accused Guatemala of threatening the sovereignty of Belize.

In August 1989, Cenac and other Caribbean foreign ministers met with Haitian head of state General Prosper Avril on the subject of future elections in the country.

Cenac served as foreign minister until 1992. He was later president of the Senate of Saint Lucia from October 1992 to June 1997.

References

1939 births
Living people
Saint Lucia Labour Party politicians
United Workers Party (Saint Lucia) politicians
Governors-General of Saint Lucia
Foreign Ministers of Saint Lucia
Presidents of the Senate of Saint Lucia
Knights Grand Cross of the Order of St Michael and St George